Emre Gürbüz (born 25 March 1991) is a Turkish footballer who plays for Elazığ Belediyespor FK. He is a versatile central defender who can also play defensive midfielder.

Gürbüz started his career with local club Mersin Kuvayi Milliye in 1998 where he has played since. Şekerspor transferred him in 2006. He was loaned out to Mersin İdman Yurdu for two seasons from 2009 to 2011. In August 2011, he signed a two-year contract with Turkish Süper Lig side Mersin İdman Yurdu.

References
 TFF 
 GOAL
 

1991 births
Living people
Turkish footballers
Mersin İdman Yurdu footballers

Association football forwards